John Ironmonger may refer to:

 John Ironmonger (footballer) (born 1961), Australian rules footballer
 John Ironmonger (writer) (born 1954), British writer